The T.G. Smith Centre is an ice hockey complex in Steinbach, Manitoba, Canada. It features two indoor arenas and one outdoor ice rink.

History
The original part of the complex, the Steinbach Centennial Arena, opened in 1967 and accommodates up to 1,250 spectators (seated and standing room combined).  A second indoor rink was constructed in the mid-1990s after which the entire complex was named after the late T.G. Smith, a local banker and supporter of local sport programs.  The newer of the two indoor rinks, the T.G. Smith Arena, has a capacity of approximately 300.

The T.G. Smith Centre has been the home of the Steinbach Pistons of the Manitoba Junior Hockey League since 2009.   It is also the longtime home of the Steinbach Huskies junior and senior hockey teams, as well as the community's minor hockey, ringette, and figure skating programs.

In Senior 'AAA' hockey, the arena has played host to two Allan Cup national senior "AAA" championships: the Steinbach North Stars, active from 2007 to 2010, hosted the 2009 event, while the South East Prairie Thunder hosted in 2016.

In international hockey, the T.G. Smith Centre hosted the ninth place game of the 2002 World Under-17 Hockey Challenge, in which Germany defeated Finland.

Aside from hockey, the T.G. Smith Centre has hosted two Manitoba Provincial Curling Championships (2006, 2010).  The Centennial Arena's capacity can be increased to 1,600 spectators for major curling events.

The arena underwent major renovations in 2017 which saw the installation of a new ceiling cover and LED lighting in the Centennial Arena.  In addition, a new high definition video scoreboard was purchased for the Pistons and an outdoor fireplace was installed in front of the building.  In March 2019, the T.G. Smith Centre hosted Rogers Hometown Hockey, the first time the program was hosted by a southeastern Manitoba community.

Future
In June 2012, the Steinbach city council began planning the construction of new recreational facilities for the city.  The first phase of the project, a movie theatre and the new Steinbach Curling Club attached to the T.G. Smith Centre, was completed in October 2014.  However, city council cancelled the remainder of this project in 2016.  

A new proposal by a non-profit group called Southeast Events Centre Inc. was presented and approved by city council in 2019 which would see part of the existing T.G. Smith Centre, namely the Centennial Arena, replaced with a new 2,500-seat arena, field house, and atrium.  This project was confirmed to be proceeding when funding details from all levels of government were made public in July 2021.

Major Events
 1979 Allan Cup Western Canadian Finals
 2002 Air Canada Cup Western Regional Championship
 2006 Safeway Select
 2009 Allan Cup
 2010 Safeway Select
 2013 Turnbull Cup Finals
 2015 Turnbull Cup Finals
 2016 Allan Cup
 2016 Turnbull Cup Finals
 2017 Telus Cup Western Regional Championship
 2018 Esso Cup Western Regional Championship
 2018 Turnbull Cup Finals
 2018 ANAVET Cup

External links
City of Steinbach Website

References

Sport in Steinbach, Manitoba
Indoor ice hockey venues in Canada
Indoor arenas in Manitoba
1967 establishments in Manitoba
Sports venues completed in 1967